Embassy of the State of Palestine in Sudan is the diplomatic mission of the Palestine in Sudan. It is located in Khartoum.

See also 

 List of diplomatic missions in Sudan.
 List of diplomatic missions of Palestine.

References 

Sudan
Palestine
State of Palestine–Sudan relations